Killer Shrike is the name of two fictional characters appearing in American comic books published by Marvel Comics.

Publication history

The Simon Maddicks version of Killer Shrike first appeared in The Rampaging Hulk #1 (Jan. 1977) and was created by John Warner and John Buscema.

Fictional character biography

Simon Maddicks

Simon Maddicks was born in Williamsburg, Virginia. He began his career as a soldier in the United States Army. After that, he recalls little of his own past for some reason. When he was selected to be a special agent of the Roxxon Oil Company, Maddicks became a mercenary and professional criminal, more specifically a special agent in covert operations. He was sent to the Mutagenics Laboratory of the Brand Corporation, where he underwent extensive conditioning which increased his human abilities. He also underwent surgery which implanted a miniature anti-gravity generator in his spine. Roxxon later gave Maddicks his super-villain costume and the codename "Killer Shrike".

For his first mission, Roxxon sent him to infiltrate the subversive organization called the Conspiracy, which Roxxon learned about through major purchases of technology from the Brand Corporation. The Conspiracy sent Killer Shrike to capture a monster known as Goram. The plan was thwarted by the super-hero known as Ulysses Bloodstone who short-circuited the villain's electrical weapons, badly injuring him. Feeling sorry for Killer Shrike's condition, Bloodstone's agents sent the villain to a New York hospital, where he lay comatose for several weeks.

Upon awakening from the coma, Maddicks was contacted once again by Brand scientists led by Dr. Stephen Weems. Weems, better known as the villain Modular Man, sought revenge against his enemies Spider-Man and Beast. In return, the Modular Man promised Shrike information about his past. In battle with Spider-Man and the Beast, Weems was killed before he could uphold his end of the bargain. Shrike escaped and was soon contacted by agents of the Brand Corporation. They helped restore his memory, and assigned him to undercover work as bodyguard to Brand president James Melvin. His costume became controlled by the Will-o'-the-Wisp, and he was forced to abduct Dr. Marla Madison to reconstitute the immaterial Wisp. In the end, he was defeated by Spider-Man. With Brand's public dissolution, Killer Shrike became a free agent.

With other superhuman adventurers and criminals, Killer Shrike was later captured and imprisoned by the Locksmith. He was freed by Spider-Woman. He later robbed a bank, but was defeated by Spider-Man. He then attempted a theft of a power booster from the Tinkerer after commissioning him to build it for him, but was again defeated both by Spider-Man and a failsafe function the Tinkerer installs in his products to deal with such situations.

During the events of the "Acts of Vengeance", Killer Shrike attacked Moon Knight, alongside the second Ringer and Coachwhip. He shot down the Mooncopter, seriously injuring Moon Knight's pilot Frenchie and then escaped.

Killer Shrike was later hired by Surge and battled the She-Hulk alongside Grey Gargoyle and Dragon Man, but was defeated.

Ever since, Killer Shrike was most often seen getting beaten up by several super-heroes, most often the Hulk. Killer Shrike was briefly a member of the Cardinal's team of flying super villains known as Air Force. Then, Killer Shrike appeared to have been murdered by the Soldiers of Misfortune.

In the "Secret War" miniseries, Killer Shrike's equipment got updated by the Tinkerer. This still was not enough for Maddicks to gain a victory, as he was soon afterward defeated by the Avengers, and apprehended by S.H.I.E.L.D.

During the GLX-Mas Special, Killer Shrike tried to steal a device from Roxxon Company known as "Project Z" but was defeated by the Grasshopper, an employee of the company.

Killer Shrike was later apprehended by Baron Helmut Zemo and forced to join the Thunderbolts, for so far unclear reasons.

Killer Shrike later made a cameo at the Bar With No Name.

Killer Shrike was beat up by Moon Knight and attacked in the hospital by the Black Spectre.

Killer Shrike later appeared as a member of the Shadow Council's Masters of Evil. Killer Shrike is present when Max Fury and the Masters of Evil capture John Steele after he attempts to escape Bagalia with the Serpent Crown and the Crown of Thorns.

Killer Shrike was among the villains to join Swarm's Sinister Six when they attacked Spider-Man and the students of the Jean Grey School for Higher Learning. After Swarm was defeated by Hellion, Killer Shrike and the other villains surrendered.

During the "Hunted" storyline, Killer Shrike is among the animal-themed characters that were captured by Taskmaster and Black Ant for Kraven the Hunter's "Great Hunt" that was sponsored by Arcade's company Arcade Industries. He watched the fight between Spider-Man and Scorpion until the Hunter-Bots created by Arcade Industries arrived. He then ran from the Hunter-Bots. Killer Shrike later helped the animal-themed characters fight the Hunter-Bots.

During the "Devil's Reign" storyline, Killer Shrike was seen as an inmate of the Myrmidon. Moon Knight fought him and Cactus in one of the prison matches and defeated them.

Unnamed criminal
Killer Shrike sold his original costume to Roderick Kingsley, who then sold it to an unnamed criminal. Killer Shrike was present with Hobgoblin (who was actually Roderick Kingsley's butler Claude) when he led his forces into battle against the Goblin King's Goblin Nation. After Hobgoblin was killed by Goblin King, Killer Shrike was among the villains that defected to the Goblin Nation.

Following Spider-Man's victory over the Goblin King, Killer Shrike was seen with the former Hobgoblin henchmen at the Bar with No Name where they encounter Electro. Killer Shrike is later among the villains at the Bar with No Name that convinces Black Cat to lead them.

During the "AXIS" storyline, Killer Shrike was among the supervillains that Missile Mate assembled to join the side of Phil Urich (who was operating as Goblin King) and the remnants of the Goblin Underground upon claiming that Roderick Kingsley "abandoned" them.

Killer Shrike and Melter later beat up Ringer to serve as Black Cat's warning to anyone who steals from her.

Powers and abilities
Extensive conditioning and surgery by Brand Corporation scientists enhanced Simon Maddicks's strength and other physical abilities. He is capable of flight by means of a surgically implanted anti-gravity generator at the base of his spine, activated by a neural link.

Besides that, he has extensive training and experience in hand-to-hand combat and martial arts, and proficiency with hand weapons including guns and knives.

Killer Shrike wears body armor, an armored suit made of an insulated steel alloy mesh capable of protecting him from flight turbulence and small caliber weapons fire. His major weapons system is the twin power-blasters worn on his wrists, with titanium talons capable of slashing flesh, wood, cinderblock, and light metals, and of discharging high-frequency electrical bolts.

Other versions

Ultimate Marvel
The Ultimate version of Killer Shrike made a cameo in Ultimate Spider-Man #72, trying to rob Roxxon Energy Corporation Industries of their supply of Adamantium - but was apprehended by Spider-Man. This version was a deranged, desperate man who seemed to almost froth at the mouth. Spider-Man himself referred to him as 'Steroid-Boy with a Laser Tag Fetish'. It was later revealed that he was an employee of Tinkerer hired specifically to bother Donald Roxxon as part of his revenge for firing him.

In other media
The Simon Maddicks incarnation of Killer Shrike appears in Iron Man: Armored Adventures, voiced by Ty Olsson. This version is an enforcer for the Maggia in season one and Justin Hammer / Titanium Man in season two who is often paired with Unicorn. Additionally, his anti-gravity generator is incorporated into his wrist blasters.

References

External links
 Killer Shrike at Marvel.com

Characters created by John Buscema
Comics characters introduced in 1977
Fictional characters from Virginia
Fictional mercenaries in comics
Marvel Comics characters who can move at superhuman speeds
Marvel Comics characters with superhuman strength
Marvel Comics supervillains